Bunsik is a generic term used to refer to inexpensive Korean dishes available at bunsikjeom (분식점) or bunsikjip (분식집) snack restaurants. Since the term bunsik literally means "food made from flour," foods such as ramyeon (Korean: 라면) (noodle soup) and bread can be considered bunsik. However, the modern definition of the term also includes other dishes served at bunsik restaurants that can be had in large portions at low prices, such as gimbap, tteokbokki, ramyeon, rabokki (tteokbokki with ramyeon), sundae, eomuk, twigim, and others. There is a representative Korean bunsikjip called "Gimbap-Cheonguk" (English: Gimbap Heaven)  In Korea, there are many general snack bars selling everything from simple food to a full meal menu.

History
During the 1960s, rice was scarce in South Korea, and the government was prompted to promote bunsik as an alternative. Committees were set up in each region to encourage public organizations, schools, and government offices to lead the movement. Restaurants were guided to use more barley and wheat flour while sales of rice-based foods were banned on certain days of the week. Government run restaurants in official buildings were banned from selling rice dishes altogether. This effort lasted until 1976.

References 

Korean words and phrases
 
Korean cuisine
South Korean cuisine